Wolfgang Plotka (born 16 May 1941) is a German ice hockey player, who competed for SC Dynamo Berlin. He won the bronze medal playing for the East Germany national ice hockey team at the 1966 European Championships.

Plotka also competed for East Germany at the 1968 Winter Olympics in Grenoble, scoring one goal and one assist in seven games played.

References

1941 births
Living people
German ice hockey players
Ice hockey people from Berlin
Ice hockey players at the 1968 Winter Olympics
Olympic ice hockey players of East Germany
SC Dynamo Berlin (ice hockey) players